The 1949 All-Ireland Senior Football Championship Final was the 62nd All-Ireland Final and the deciding match of the 1949 All-Ireland Senior Football Championship, an inter-county Gaelic football tournament for the top teams in Ireland.

Pre-match
Cavan were aiming for three consecutive All-Ireland football titles, having beaten Kerry at America's Polo Grounds in 1947 and beaten Mayo at Croke Park in 1948.

Match summary
Meath led 0–7 to 0–3 at half-time and were able to retain this four-point lead to the end, despite six points by Cavan's Peter Donahue.

References

All-Ireland Senior Football Championship Final
All-Ireland Senior Football Championship Final, 1949
All-Ireland Senior Football Championship Final
All-Ireland Senior Football Championship Finals
Cavan county football team matches
Meath county football team matches